Bakhtiar Khattak is a Pashto musician and singer from Peshawar, Khyber Pakhtunkhwa, Pakistan. He was born in Peshawar, Khyber Pakhtunkhwa. He also worked in AVT Khyber as a host. He is fascinated with Khan Abdul Ghani Khan's poetry.

He started singing in school when he was 4 years old. He had first sung an Urdu song for PTV and also played a role in a PTV drama Tasweroona this was happened when he was gone to audition as a singer, he was surprised to find himself cast as a part of Tasweroona due to his typical Pukhtun features and personality.

References
 

Living people
Pakistani male singers
Pashto-language singers
Pashtun people
People from Peshawar
Year of birth missing (living people)